Events from the year 1836 in Denmark.

Incumbents
 Monarch – Frederick VI
 Prime minister – Otto Joachim

Events
 March 5 – The Music Society is founded in Copenhagen, on Christoph Ernst Friedrich Weyse's birthday, and for almost a century it remains the most important music venue in Denmark

Undated

Births
 2 February – Wilhelm Hellesen, industrialist and inventor (died 1892)
 24 April – Ditlev Torm, businessman (died 1907)
 12 May – Ludvig Grundtvig, photographer (died 1901)
 4 August – Vilhelm Dahlerup, architect (died 1907)
 5 August – Vilhelm Bissen, sculptor (died 1913)
 29 August –  Christian Conrad Sophus Danneskiold-Samsøe, landowner and theatre director (died 1908)

Deaths

References

 
1830s in Denmark
Denmark
Years of the 19th century in Denmark